Shalamberidze (in Georgian შალამბერიძე) is a Georgian surname. It may refer to:

Alexander Shalamberidze (1958–2015), Georgian politician
Koba Shalamberidze (born 1984), Georgian professional football player 
Roland Shalamberidze (born 1958), Russian artist of Georgian origin
Georgian-language surnames
Surnames of Georgian origin